St. Paul's Protestant Episcopal Church is a historic Episcopal church located at 122 East Pine Street in Georgetown, Sussex County. The congregation started in 1794 but this brick building was completed in 1844. It was remodeled in 1881 by McKim Mead and White of New York City in the early Victorian Gothic style. This is one of the 38 parish churches of the Episcopal Diocese of Delaware, and it is listed on the National Register of Historic Places. Many statesmen from Sussex County are interred in the churchyard, including Caleb R. Layton, Daniel J. Layton, Charles C. Stockley and others.

History 
The congregation was organized on June 21, 1794 soon after the American Revolutionary War, after the Anglican Church was disestablished in the United States and the Episcopal Church was founded. The group acquired a plot of land on Front and Pine streets, though it was never used and sold in 1806. In the absence of a church structure, the Rev. James Wiltbank conducted services infrequently in the court house. In 1804 the congregation acquired the current lot at East Pine and Academy streets. They built a wood-frame structure over the next two decades.

In 1805 the Delaware legislature passed an act allowing this vestry to raise $1500 by lottery for the construction of the church. New congregations were learning how to support their parishes. A wooden church was constructed and on January 25, 1806, the Rev. Hamilton Bell dedicated it, though it was not complete. The legislature authorized another lottery in 1827 to raise $10,000 for the construction of an academy and a Masonic Hall in Georgetown, as well as for the completion of St. Paul's. This lottery was never held.

In 1843 the frame church was removed from the site and construction of a new brick church began. This structure was completed in 1844 and consecrated on November 19 of the same year. By 1881 after nearly 40 years, the church had fallen into relative disrepair. It was renovated and remodeled in the early Victorian Gothic style, by the architectural firm of McKim, Mead, and White of New York City, distinguished nationally for designing a number of notable churches. It has been maintained in this style.

Rev. James C. Kerr arrived in 1885 and installed the church's first pipe organ. The following year a Sunday School chapel was organized and a building for it was constructed in the 1870s. Finally in 1897 the complex was completed with a 29' by 43' two-story frame rectory, constructed on adjacent property by John W. Messick for the sum of $1500. The Rev. John Warnock was the first rector to live in the rectory.

In 1930 U.S. Senator Willard Saulsbury, Jr. bequeathed St. Paul's funds to commission a stained-glass altar window; the work is known as "The Te Deum Window," depicting the faith of the Church as stated in the creed-anthem "The Te Deum."  The window was designed by James H. Hogan of the London studios of James Powell & Sons. It was dedicated February 9, 1930 by the bishop.

The National Register of Historic Places added the church to its list in 1979. In 1987 a fire of an unknown origin destroyed the parish hall, Sunday School classrooms and sacristy, though the sanctuary and nave were not damaged. These parts were subsequently rebuilt in 1990.

Partial list of burials 
The following data in most cases comes from tombstones in the churchyard, where some dates are illegible. Missing dates have been indicated by question marks. In cases where only some numbers are legible, underscores represent the missing number. Titles, positions and relationships have been included to distinguish people with similar or identical names and give further information.

Sarah Layton Mumford (? - 14 January 1894 aged 95 years)
Joshua S. Layton, Jr. (15 February 1843 - 5 March 1843)
Richard M. Layton  (2_  July 1848 - 11 February 184_)
Harriet Ann, (11 October 1822 - 7 November 1824), daughter of Joshua S. & Sally Ann Layton
Laura Spry, daughter of Joshua S. & Sally Ann Layton (6 March 1838 - 24 May 1839)
Sally Ann, (? -  25 April 1844 aged 40 yrs, 2 months & 23 days), wife of Joshua S. Layton, Esq. 
Joshua S. Layton, Esq. (11 January 1801 - 25 March 1849)
Harriett Ann, (died 10 September 1855 in her _8th year), wife of Joshua S. Layton and daughter of Rev. ? & Ann Manlove 
Sinah P., (17 November 1810 - 13 November 1887) wife of John Sorden 
Caleb Rodney Layton, (10 March 1826 - 20 August 1887), son of Caleb & Penelope R. Layton 
Daniel John Layton, (14 November 1833 - 19 January 1916), son of Caleb & Penelope R. Layton	
Penelope Rodney McKim, (23 April 1836 - 28 September 1917), wife of Rev. John Linn McKim and daughter of Caleb & Penelope R. Layton 
Charles H. Richards, M.D. (22 November 1827 - 10 January 1899)
Elizabeth Anderson Richards (26 November 1830 - 21 November 1922)
John Richards (? - 10 July 1863 aged 75 years)
Martha, wife of John Richards (? - 22 September 1880 aged 75 years)
Harold C. Todd (23 June 1921 - 2 March 1992)
Ellen E. Todd (12 June 1919 - ?)
Anna Hartung Layton (17 June 1862 - 1 April 1951)
Landreth Lee Layton  (1 November 1860 - 14 June 1934)
Margaret Elizabeth Layton (14 August 1888 - 28 October 1974)
Caleb R. Layton, M.D., (8 September 1851 - 11 November 1930), U.S. Representative 
Annie E. Sipple Layton (18 July 1849 - 12 August 1925)
Daniel J. Layton, Esq., (1 August 1879 - 13 May 1960), Attorney General of Delaware, Chief Justice of Delaware Supreme Court 
Laura H. Layton (13 October 1884 - 28 February 1960)
John Marvel (1622-1707)
Ann Marvel (no date on headstone) 
Thomas Marvel (d. 1753)
Elizabeth Huggins Marvel (no date on headstone)
Robert Marvel (1737-1776)
Rachel Chase Marvel (d. 1791)
Philip Marvel (no date on headstone)
Elizabeth Short Marvel (no date on headstone)
Josiah Marvel (1780-1861)
Amelia Daffin Marvel (no date on headstone)
Lovel Tindal Marvel (1787-1853)

References

External links
 

Churches on the National Register of Historic Places in Delaware
Episcopal church buildings in Delaware
Gothic Revival church buildings in Delaware
McKim, Mead & White church buildings
Religious organizations established in 1794
Churches in Sussex County, Delaware
19th-century Episcopal church buildings
Churches completed in 1844
Buildings and structures in Georgetown, Delaware
National Register of Historic Places in Sussex County, Delaware
1794 establishments in Delaware